Statistics of the Yemeni League in the 1997–98 season.

Results

External links
 

Yem
Yemeni League seasons
football
football